McGregor Apartments is a historic apartment complex comprising three buildings in Ogden, Utah. They were built between 1924 and 1926 by McGregor Bros. Construction, and designed in the Prairie School style. They are each three-story high. The complex been listed on the National Register of Historic Places since December 31, 1987.

References

National Register of Historic Places in Weber County, Utah
Prairie School architecture in Utah
Residential buildings completed in 1924
1924 establishments in Utah